In mathematics, the Andreotti–Vesentini separation theorem, introduced by  states that certain cohomology groups of coherent sheaves are separated.

References

.
.

Complex manifolds
Theorems in topology